Bourke County may refer to:
 Bourke County, New South Wales, Australia
 Bourke County, Victoria, Australia